Southwestern High School is a public high school located approximately 7 miles southwest of Shelbyville, Indiana.

Athletics
Southwestern High School's athletic teams are the Spartans and they compete in the Mid-Hoosier Conference. The school offers a wide range of athletics including:

Baseball
Basketball (Men's and Women's)
Cross Country (Men's and Women's)
Golf
Tennis (Men's and Women's)
Track and Field (Men's and Women's)
Soccer
Softball
Volleyball

Basketball
The 2015-2016 Men's basketball team went 14-11 overall and lost to Tindley High School (53-49) in the 2015-16 IHSAA Class 1A Boys Basketball State Tournament.

See also
 List of high schools in Indiana

References

External links
 Official website

Buildings and structures in Shelby County, Indiana
Schools in Shelby County, Indiana
Public middle schools in Indiana
Public high schools in Indiana